Meineckia is a genus of flowering plants in the family Phyllanthaceae first described as a genus in 1858.

Meineckia is one of eight genera in the tribe Poranthereae. They are native to the Americas, South Asia, Africa, and Madagascar. The genus is particularly well represented in Madagascar. Species of Meineckia may be monoecious or dioecious. They are trees or shrubs, or rarely, they are subherbaceous.

Species

Meineckia acuminata – Morogoro
Meineckia baronii – NW Madagascar
Meineckia bartlettii – Jalisco, Chiapas, Belize, Honduras
Meineckia calycina – Anamalai Hills
Meineckia capillipes – Guatemala, Honduras
Meineckia cerebroides – SE Madagascar
Meineckia decaryi – Madagascar
Meineckia filipes – Socotra
Meineckia fruticans – Kenya, Tanzania
Meineckia gracilipes – SE Madagascar
Meineckia grandiflora – Ulanga, Lindi
Meineckia humbertii – SW Madagascar
Meineckia leandrii – W Madagascar
Meineckia longipes – SW India
Meineckia macropus – Mishmi Hills
Meineckia madagascariensis – E Madagascar
Meineckia neogranatensis – Nicaragua, Colombia, Brazil
Meineckia nguruensis – Nguru 
Meineckia orientalis – E Madagascar
Meineckia ovata – Teita 
Meineckia parvifolia – S India, Sri Lanka
Meineckia paxii – Lushoto
Meineckia peltata – Madagascar
Meineckia phyllanthoides – C + E Africa, Oman, Yemen
Meineckia pubiflora – SW Madagascar
Meineckia stipularis – Tanzania
Meineckia trichogynis – Madagascar
Meineckia uzungwaensis – Mufindi
Meineckia vestita – Tanzania
Meineckia websteri – Madagascar

Circumscription
The circumscription of Meineckia has undergone several changes since Henri Ernest Baillon erected the genus in 1858. Some of its species have been put in other genera and sometimes other genera have been merged with it. The name Peltandra had been used for some species in Meineckia, but this is now a nomen rejectum. The name Peltandra is now conserved as the name of a genus in Araceae.

Meineckia was last revised in 2008 by Vorontsova and Hoffmann. They recognized 30 species and divided the genus into two subgenera.

Meineckia subgenus Petaliferae has only two species: its type species, Meineckia cerebroides, and Meineckia gracilipes. They are dioecious shrubs from Madagascar. Their petals are very small.

Meineckia subgenus Meineckia has 28 species. Its type species, Meineckia phyllanthoides, is the same as that of the genus. They are monoecious or dioecious trees or shrubs, or sometimes, subherbaceous. Their flowers have no petals. This subgenus is the only completely apetalous taxon in the tribe Poranthereae.

Vorontsova and Hoffmann did not recognize Zimmermannia and Zimmermanniopsis as separate genera, but placed their species in Meineckia subgenus Meineckia.

References

External links
 Peltandra At: IPNI
 Peltandra At:Index Nominum Genericorum At: References At: NMNH Department of Botany At: Research and Collections At: Smithsonian National Museum of Natural History
 Meineckia At: ING

 
Dioecious plants
Phyllanthaceae genera
Taxa named by Henri Ernest Baillon